Jessie Lartey (born 18 January 1993) is a Ghanaian boxer. He represented Ghana at the 2018 Commonwealth Games, where he won a bronze medal.

References

External links 
 
  (2010)
  (2014)
 
 

1993 births
Living people
Ghanaian male boxers
Light-welterweight boxers
Lightweight boxers
Bantamweight boxers
Commonwealth Games medallists in boxing
Commonwealth Games bronze medallists for Ghana
Boxers at the 2010 Commonwealth Games
Boxers at the 2014 Commonwealth Games
Boxers at the 2018 Commonwealth Games
Boxers from Accra
Medallists at the 2018 Commonwealth Games